Lewinella aquimaris  is a Gram-negative and non-motile bacterium from the genus of Lewinella which has been isolated from seawater from the Yellow Sea in Korea.

References

External links
Type strain of Lewinella aquimaris at BacDive -  the Bacterial Diversity Metadatabase
	

Bacteroidota
Bacteria described in 2016